The 2018 Queensland Cup season was the 23rd season of Queensland's top-level statewide rugby league competition run by the Queensland Rugby League. The competition, known as the Intrust Super Cup due to sponsorship from Intrust Super, featured 14 teams playing a 28-week long season (including finals) from March to September.

The Redcliffe Dolphins won their sixth premiership after defeating the Easts Tigers 32–22 in the Grand Final at Suncorp Stadium. Ipswich Jets  Nathaniel Neale was named the competition's Player of the Year, winning the Petero Civoniceva Medal.

Teams
In 2018, the lineup of teams remained unchanged for the fourth consecutive year.

Ladder

Final series

Grand Final

Redcliffe finished the regular season as minor premiers for the sixth time and earned a bye in the first week of the finals. In the major semi final, they defeated Burleigh 13–6 and qualified for their 11th Grand Final. Easts finished fifth on the ladder and defeated the fourth-placed Northern Pride 32–0 in the first week of the finals. In the minor semi final, they eliminated Ipswich 50–20 before upsetting Burleigh in the preliminary final to qualify for their fifth Grand Final. Redcliffe and Easts last met in a Grand Final in 1997, with the Dolphins winning 18–16.

First half
Redcliffe were the first to score in the Grand Final thanks to a Kotoni Staggs penalty goal from 20 metres out. The first try of the contest went to Easts, with Conor Carey stretching out to score in the corner. Redcliffe recorded their first four-pointer in the 16th minute when a late Cameron Cullen offload found fullback Trai Fuller who muscled his way over. They scored their second when Jeremy Hawkins leapt high to catch a Bryce Donovan kick and planted it down for a try. Another penalty goal in the 33rd minute gave the Dolphins a 14–6 lead. Easts hit back in the shadow of half time when Marion Seve scored out wide to cut the margin to four points.

Second half
The Dolphins opened the second half with an early try when Fuller ducked through the Tigers' defence to score his second try. They extended their lead in the 46th minute when a Donovan grubber was kept alive by Aaron Whitchurch, who batted infield for Staggs to score. Easts got back into the game in the 56th minute when captain Jake Foster barged over from close range to score. In the 62nd minute, Redcliffe all but sealed the win when Donovan set up another try with his boot, this time finding Nathan Watt who dived on his grubber. The Tigers got one back two minutes later through fullback Scott Drinkwater but it proved to be a consolation try in the end, as Redcliffe ended the game with a try to Tom Opacic in the 78th minute. Dolphins' second rower Toby Rudolf was awarded the Duncan Hall Medal for man of the match.

NRL State Championship

After winning the Grand Final, the Redcliffe Dolphins qualified for the NRL State Championship on NRL Grand Final day. They were defeated by the Canterbury-Bankstown Bulldogs, the New South Wales Cup premiers, 18–42.

Player statistics

Leading try scorers

Leading point scorers

QRL awards
 Petero Civoniceva Medal (Best and Fairest): Nathaniel Neale ( Ipswich Jets)
 Coach of the Year: Ty Williams ( Northern Pride)
 Rookie of the Year: Jake Clifford ( Northern Pride)
 Representative Player of the Year: David Fifita ( Queensland under-18,  Souths Logan Magpies)

Team of the Year

See also

 Queensland Cup
 Queensland Rugby League

References

2018 in Australian rugby league
Queensland Cup